The American Association of Christian Schools (AACS) is an American fundamentalist organization based in Chattanooga, Tennessee, that unifies individual conservative Protestant schools and statewide Protestant school associations across the country for the purpose of accreditation, competition, and group benefits.

Members subscribe to a Statement of Faith based on Biblical literalism, creationism, and a rejection of ecumenism.

History
The American Association of Christian Schools began in August 1972 in Miami, Florida. Instrumental in the founding of AACS, Al Janney, president and founder of the Florida Association of Christian Schools, was president of AACS from 1972 to 1992. The first recorded AACS board meeting was held in Dallas, Texas, on November 30, 1972. During this time, the Protestant school movement in the United States grew rapidly and experienced opposition. AACS provided its membership leadership, legislative protection, and high-quality educational programs.

AACS expanded services as its membership increased throughout the 1970s. In 1978 Arno (Bud) Weniger Jr., became executive vice president and assumed responsibility for day-to-day operations, and the office was moved from Hialeah, Florida, to Normal, Illinois. The nonprofit, tax-exempt organizational status of AACS was clarified in 1980. When Gerry Carlson was promoted to executive director in 1985, AACS opened a DC-area office in Fairfax, Virginia. Under Dr. Weniger’s leadership (1978–1988), AACS continued to grow, with the number of member schools passing the 1,000 mark in 1982.

Upon Dr. Janney’s retirement in 1992, the AACS national office moved to Independence, Missouri, and Carl Herbster became president. Under his leadership (1992–2003), AACS services and schools expanded. Directed by Charles Walker, the AACS education office opened in Chattanooga, Tennessee, in 1993. The AACS legal office was established in Atlanta, Georgia, in May 1996. In 1998, AACS purchased a four-level building in the Capitol Hill Historic District within one block of the U.S. House of Representatives office buildings to house the AACS office in Washington, D.C.

In 2003, Keith Wiebe became the third president of AACS, and Charles Walker was appointed to serve as executive director. The national office was moved from Kansas City to Chattanooga, Tennessee, in September 2003. In 2009, Dr. Walker resigned as executive director and education director, and Jeff Walton became the executive director of AACS."

State associations
The AACS includes 37 associations, each representing the AACS schools in its state.

Public policy advocacy
The AACS has an active lobbying program in Washington and sends periodic communications to its members providing news and recommended positions on current federal and state legislative proposals in the areas it describes as "education, religious liberty, pro-family, pro-gun and pro-life issues."

Land letter
In 2002, AACS president Carl D. Herbster was one of five evangelical Protestant leaders who signed the "Land letter" to President George W. Bush, outlining their theological support for a  pre-emptive invasion of Iraq as a just war.

References

External links
AACS official site

United States schools associations
Christian educational organizations
Evangelical parachurch organizations
Christian schools in the United States